Aulchand (1686–1769) was a Bengali Hindu spiritual leader who founded the Kartabhaja philosophy. Kartabhajas consider Aulchand to be an incarnation of Vishnu and therefore think him one with Krishna and Gouranga.

Early life 
In 1694, Mahadeb Barui, a resident of Ula in Nadia discovered an abandoned male child in a betel plantation and decided to adopt him. At that time, the child was about eight years of age. He named the child Purna Chandra and raised him for 12 years. At the age of 20, Purna Chandra left his house. Thereafter he stayed in the house of a Gandhabanik for two years and then in the residence of a landlord for another one and half years. At the age of 24, he completely denounced the material life and went about wandering from place to place. He travelled to various regions especially in the districts of Nadia, 24 Parganas and the Sunderban area.

Spiritual life 
At the age of 37, he arrived at the village of Bejra, where Hatu Ghosh and others became his disciple. Most of his initial twenty two disciples were from the lower castes.

 Hatu Ghosh
 Bechu Ghosh
 Ramsharan Pal
 Nayan
 Lakshmikanta
 Nityananda Das
 Khelaram Udasin
 Krishna Das
 Hari Ghosh
 Kanai Ghosh
 Shankar
 Nitai Ghosh
 Ananda Ram
 Manohar Das
 Kinu
 Gobinda
 Shyam Kansari
 Bhimray Rajput
 Panchu Ruidas
 Nidhiram Ghosh
 Bishnu Das
 Shishuram

Later life 
In 1769, Aulchand left for his heavenly abode in the village of Boalia near present-day Kalyani. He was cremated in Parari village near Chakdaha in Nadia district.

1686 births
1769 deaths
18th-century Hindu philosophers and theologians
Bengali Hindu saints